The 2019–20 Princeton Tigers women's basketball team represented Princeton University during the 2019–20 NCAA Division I women's basketball season. The Tigers, led by first-year head coach Carla Berube, played their home games at Jadwin Gymnasium as members of the Ivy League.

The Tigers finished the season with a 26–1 overall record, 14–0 in the Ivy League. They won the conference's regular season championship.

The Ivy League Tournament and NCAA tournament was cancelled due to the COVID-19 outbreak.

Previous season
The Tigers finished the 2017–18 season with a 22–10 overall record and 12–2 in the Ivy League. They tied Penn for first place in the conference's regular season to meet them in a playoff to determine which Ivy League team received a first-round bid for the NCAA tournament. The Tigers won, but lost in the first round to 17th-ranked Kentucky.

Roster

Schedule

|-
!colspan=8 style=| Non-Conference Regular season

|-
!colspan=8 style=| Ivy League Regular season

|-
!colspan=8 style=| Ivy League Tournament

References

Princeton
Princeton Tigers women's basketball seasons
Princeton Tigers women's
Princeton Tigers women's